Peter James Dumbreck, nicknamed "Shunty", "Dumbo" (play on "Dumbreck"), or by some, "King Peter" (born 13 October 1973), is a Scottish professional racing driver.

Biography
Born in Kirkcaldy, Dumbreck dominated the 1994 British Formula Vauxhall Junior championship and followed this in 1996 with a similarly strong performance when he won ten races to take the full Formula Vauxhall Championship.

After finishing third in British Formula 3 in 1997, he took the 1998 Japanese Formula 3 title with a record-breaking eight wins out of ten races. The climax of Dumbreck's 1998 season was victory at the Macau Grand Prix – a race that traditionally attracts entries from all the world's top flight Formula 3 drivers.

This dominant outing in Japanese Formula 3 enabled Dumbreck to move up to the Formula Nippon championship for the 1999 season. Driving for Team LeyJun, his performances were good enough for seventh in the championship (including both a second place finish and a pole position in Round 4 at Fuji) as well as scoring all of the team's points for the season.

An aerodynamic design flaw caused the front of the car to rise and then flip without any external contact; Mark Webber had already suffered similar crashes in the No. 4 car during the Thursday night practice and the Saturday morning Warm-up. The remaining No. 6 car was retired immediately, and the team withdrew from all other planned entries in endurance racing and the American Le Mans Series.

When the Deutsche Tourenwagen Masters (DTM) returned from the 2000 season onwards, Dumbreck continued to race for Mercedes-Benz in the DTM touring car championship until 2002. A third place in the final standings of the 2001 season was his best result. He then moved to the Opel team in 2003 and 2004 where he suffered another major accident at Zandvoort track in 2004.

In 2005 Dumbreck returned to Japanese Super GT (JGTC/Super GT) in the midst of the season, driving a Toyota which became Lexus from 2006 to 2008. His first victory for Lexus came at Fuji on 4 May 2006.

In 2006, he returned to Le Mans and drove the No. 85 Spyker Spyder for Spyker Squadron in the GT2 class, but that car retired with only 40 laps completed resulting in 47th finish overall.  The same result occurred two years later 52nd overall only 43 laps completed. In 2010, Dumbreck returned again with Spyker and finally finished the race 27th overall, a classified finisher, and ninth place in GT2.

In 2015, he won third place overall at the 43rd ADAC Zurich Nürburgring 24 Hour Endurance Race with Falken Motorsports.

On 12 May 2017 he broke the lap record at the Nürburgring Nordschleife with the full electric Supercar NIO EP9 by Chinese manufacturer NIO with a 6:45.90. It was the first time a full electric car held the lap record at the Nordschleife.

Racing record

24 Hours of Le Mans results

Complete Deutsche Tourenwagen Masters results
(key) (Races in bold indicate pole position) (Races in italics indicate fastest lap)

† – Retired, but was classified as he completed 90% of the winner's race distance.

1 – A non-championship one-off race was held in 2004, in Shanghai, China.

Complete Porsche Supercup results
(key) (Races in bold indicate pole position) (Races in italics indicate fastest lap)

‡ – Not eligible for points for entering as a guest driver.

Complete JGTC/Super GT results 
(key) (Races in bold indicate pole position) (Races in italics indicate fastest lap)

Complete Formula Nippon results
(key) (Races in bold indicate pole position) (Races in italics indicate fastest lap)

Complete GT1 World Championship results

Complete FIA World Endurance Championship results

Complete WeatherTech SportsCar Championship results
(key) (Races in bold indicate pole position; results in italics indicate fastest lap)

References

External links

 DTM career
Peter Dumbreck

Motorsport.com: Magazine channel
Japanese (F) Race Results 1998
SUPERGT.net | 2006 Team Information
SUPERGT.net | 2006 Round3 Race Review

1973 births
Living people
Scottish racing drivers
Sportspeople from Kirkcaldy
Formula Nippon drivers
Japanese Formula 3 Championship drivers
Deutsche Tourenwagen Masters drivers
Super GT drivers
24 Hours of Le Mans drivers
American Le Mans Series drivers
European Le Mans Series drivers
FIA GT1 World Championship drivers
Porsche Supercup drivers
Supercars Championship drivers
FIA World Endurance Championship drivers
Blancpain Endurance Series drivers
International GT Open drivers
ADAC GT Masters drivers
24 Hours of Daytona drivers
WeatherTech SportsCar Championship drivers
24 Hours of Spa drivers
HWA Team drivers
Phoenix Racing drivers
Aston Martin Racing drivers
Mercedes-AMG Motorsport drivers
Paul Stewart Racing drivers
Level 5 Motorsports drivers
TOM'S drivers
Nürburgring 24 Hours drivers
Porsche Carrera Cup Germany drivers